Climate change is having major effects on the Chinese economy, society and the environment. China is the largest emitter of carbon dioxide, through an energy infrastructure heavily focused on coal. Other industries, such as a burgeoning construction industry and industrial manufacturing, contribute heavily to carbon emissions. However, like other developing countries, on a per-capita basis, China's carbon emissions are considerably less than countries like the United States. It has also been noted that higher-income countries have outsourced emissions-intensive industries to China. On the basis of cumulative  emissions measured from 1751 through to 2017, China is responsible for 13% globally and about half of the United States' cumulative emissions.

China is suffering from the negative effects of global warming in agriculture, forestry and water resources, and is expected to continue to see increased impacts. China's government is taking some measures to increase renewable energy, and other decarbonization efforts, vowing to hit peak emissions before 2030 and be carbon neutral by 2060 by adopting "more vigorous policies and measures."

Greenhouse gas emissions

Impacts on the natural environment 

China has and will suffer some of the effects of global warming, including sea level rise, glacier retreat and air pollution.

Temperature and weather changes 

There has also been an increased occurrence of climate-related disasters such as drought and flood, and the amplitude is growing. These events have grave consequences for productivity when they occur, and also create serious repercussions for the natural environment and infrastructure. This threatens the lives of billions and aggravates poverty.

Responding to Climate Change: China's Policies and Actions

First in Preface: China's New Responses to Climate Change.

Second in Preface: Implementing a National Strategy of Actively Responding to climate Change.

Third in Preface: Significant Changes in China's Response to Climate Change.

Fourth in Preface: Building a Fair and Rational Global Climate Governance System for Win-Win Results.

Since the 18th National Congress of the Chinese Communist Party (CCP) convened in 2012, China has prioritized its response to climate change.

A study published in 2017, using continuous and coherent severe weather reports from over 500 manned stations from 1961 to 2010, found a significant decreasing trend in severe weather occurrence across China, with the total number of severe weather days that have either thunderstorms, hail and/or damaging wind decreasing about 50% from 1961 to 2010. The reduction in severe weather occurrences correlated strongly with the weakening of the East Asian summer monsoon.

There was an annual increase in concentrations of carbon dioxide from 1990 to 2016. The annual mean concentration of atmospheric carbon dioxide,  methane, and nitrous oxide at Wanliguan Station were 404.4 ppm, 1907 ppb, and 329.7 ppb separately in 2016, slightly higher than the global mean concentration in 2016.

Sea level rise 

The sea level rise was 3.4mm/year from 1980 to 2019 compared to the global average of 3.2mm/year.

China's first National Assessment of Global Climate Change, released in the 2000s by the Ministry of Science and Technology (MOST), states that China already suffers from the environmental impacts of climate change: increase of surface and ocean temperature, rise of sea level. Temperatures in the Tibetan Plateau of China are rising four times faster than anywhere else (data from 2011). Rising sea level is an alarming trend because China has a very long and densely populated coastline, with some of the most economically developed cities such as Shanghai, Tianjin, and Guangzhou situated there. Chinese research has estimated that a one-meter rise in sea level would inundate 92,000 square kilometers of China's coast, thereby displacing 67 million people.

Climate change caused an increase in sea level, threatening to impair the functions of harbors.

Rising sea levels affect China's coastal land.  Cities along the coast such as Shanghai, only 3–5 meters above sea level leaves its 18 million residents vulnerable.  Sea levels in Victoria Harbor in Hong Kong have already risen .12 meters in the last 50 years.

Ecosystems 
Climate change increases forest belt limits and frequencies of pests and diseases, decreases frozen earth areas, and threatens to decrease glacial areas in northwest China. The vulnerability of ecosystems may increase due to future climate change. In the years 1970-2016 the occurrence of crop pest and diseases increased 4 times. 22% of that rise are due to climate change. By the year 2100 the occurrence will rise 243% under a low emission scenario and by 460% under a high emissions scenario. China is the biggest producer of wheat and rice in the world. It is in the second place in maize production.

China is home to 17,300 species of plants and animals: 667 vertebrates, ancient flora and fauna. Due to rising global temperatures, within the next century 20-30% of species will go extinct.

More than one fourth of China is covered by desert, which is growing due to desertification.  Desertification in China destroys farmland, biodiversity, and exacerbates poverty.

Water resources 
Climate change decreased total water resources in North China while increasing total water resources in South China. There were more floods, drought, and extreme weather events. There may be a big impact on the spatial and temporal distribution in China's water resources, increasing extreme weather events and natural disasters.

Glacier melting in the Northern Region of China causes flooding in the upper parts of the Yangtze River.  This ruins soil and arable land.  The glacial melting causes lower parts of the Yangtze River to have lower volumes of water, also disrupting farming.

Furthermore, climate change will worsen the uneven distribution of water resources in China. Outstanding rises in temperature would exacerbate evapotranspiration, intensifying the risk of water shortage for agricultural production in the North. Although China's southern region has an abundance of rainfall, most of its water is lost due to flooding. As the Chinese government faces challenges managing its expanding population, increased demand for water to support the nation's economic activity and people will burden the government. In essence, a water shortage is indeed a large concern for the country.

Overfishing and rising ocean temperatures are killing the coral reefs in the South China Sea.  This lowers biodiversity, and negatively affects the fish market economy in China.

Impacts on people

Health impacts 
Climate change has a significant impact on the health of Chinese people. The high temperature has caused health risks for some groups of people, such as older people (≥65 years old), outdoor workers, or people living in poverty. In 2019, each person who is older than 65 years had to endure extra 13 days of the heatwave, and 26,800 people died because of the heatwave in 2019.

In the future, the probability rate of malaria transmission will increase 39-140 percent if the temperature increase of 1-2 degrees Celsius in south China.

Economic impacts 
According to the IPCC Sixth Assessment Report the country that will pay the highest financial cost if the temperature continue to rise is China. The impacts will include food insecurity, water scarcity, flooding, especially in coastal areas where most of the population lives due to higher than average sea level rise, and more powerful cyclones. At some point part of the country can face wet-bulb temperatures higher than humans and other mammals can tolerate more than six hours.

Agriculture 
The negative effects on China's agriculture caused by climate change have appeared. There was an increase in agricultural production instability, severe damages caused by high temperature and drought, and lower production and quality in the prairie. In the near future, climate change may cause negative influences, causing a reduction of output in wheat, rice, and corn, and change the agricultural distribution of production. China is also dealing with agricultural issues due global demands of products such as soybeans. This global demand is causing coupled effects that stretch across oceans which in turn is affecting other countries.

Fishing Industry 
Due to overfishing, pollution, global temperature increase, and change in pH to the world's oceans, the South China Sea is suffering from a lack in biodiversity among marine life. Historically, China was the world's largest capture fisheries and aquaculture producer, making the fish market a significant part of the Chinese economy. Due to the environmental impacts, coral reefs in the South China Sea are dying, decreasing the amount of marine life in the South China Sea. Fisheries are not able to catch the amount of fish that was once brought to the fish market, making that part of the economy suffer. The amount of fishing in China is unsustainable, and therefore declining. The fishing industry supplies a significant amount of jobs, exports, and domestic consumption, which will disappear if the fishing industry collapses.

Mitigation and adaptation 
In general, the climate policy of China can be described as "underpromise so that it can overdeliver". China sets itself low climate targets that cannot surely prevent a 2 degrees temperature rise, but it mostly achieves and even overachieve its targets. China wants to peak its carbon emissions before 2030 and became carbon neutral by 2070. The paramount leader of China declared that his country will stop financing coal power plants abroad.  China achieved 9 of its 15 climate targets in the Paris agreement before it was planned to happen. The climate policy of China can become more effective as a result of higher climate ambition of other countries and better cooperation with the USA. In March 2022 China increased its fossil fuel production "amid growing fears of global energy shortages and rising concerns of an economic slump".

The main climate targets of China as of 2022:
 Peak  emissions before the year 2030.
 Reach net zero emissions before the year 2060.

According to a report China will probably overachieved its targets, will peak emission already in 2025, and by 2030 they will return to current levels. However, such pathway still leads to 3 degree temperature rise.

Calculations in 2021 showed that for giving the world a 50% chance of avoiding a temperature rise of 2 degrees or more China should increase its climate commitments by 7%. For a 95% chance it should increase the commitments by 24%. For giving a 50% chance of staying below 1.5 degrees China should increase its commitments by 41%.

Mitigation approaches 

In 2022, China issued its climate targets in the 14th Five-Year Plan. Those include: reduce the economy's energy intensity by 13.5%, reduce the  intensity of the economy by 18%, increase in the share of nonfossil energy to about 20%. The change is in comparison to the numbers for the year 2021. All three targets should be achieved by 2025. 

In the beginning of the year 2022 a government-supported research said China will peak  emissions in the year 2027 at 12.2Gt and reach net zero carbon emissions before 2060 if it will change its development model.

Renewable energy

Energy efficiency 
A 2011 report by a project facilitated by World Resources Institute stated that the 11th five-year plan (2005 to 2010), in response to worsening energy intensity in the 2002-2005 period, set a goal of a 20% improvement of energy intensity. The report stated that this goal likely was achieved or nearly achieved. The next five-year plan set a goal of improving energy intensity by 16%. In 2022 China published a plan of energy conservation for the 14th five-year plan (2021 to 2025) with a target of cutting energy consumption per unit of GDP by 13.5% by the year 2025 in comparison to the level of 2020. The plan regards 17 different sectors in the economy. In some sectors 20% - 40% of the capacities are not meeting the standards they need to meet by 2025. This policy expects to benefit the biggest companies who have the possibility to reach the targets.

In the provinces of China, there are various projects held aiming to solve emissions reduction and energy-saving, which is a big step in tackling climate change. Beijing is developing in replacing traditional bulbs with energy-saving light bulbs. Provinces such as Rizhao and Dezhou are promoting solar energy in the building heating system. Besides, Tsinghua University launched a lead on low-carbon city development. The city is currently working with Tsinghua University to improve the urban environment by introducing renewable energy into industries and households. More than 360 Chinese cities have dockless bike-sharing systems that deploy nearly 20 million bicycles that travel an average of 47 million kilometres per day. According to the World Resources Institute report, dockless bike-sharing systems reduced China's GHG emissions by 4.8 million tonnes of  annually.

Adaptation approaches 

China has experienced a seven-fold increase in the frequency of floods since the 1950s, rising every decade. The frequency of extreme rainfall has increased and is predicted to continue to increase in the western and southern parts of China. The country is currently undertaking efforts to reduce the threat of these floods (which have the potential effect of completely destroying vulnerable communities), largely focusing on improving the infrastructure responsible for tracking and maintaining adequate water levels. That being said, the country is promoting the extension of technologies for water allocation and water-saving mechanisms. In the country's National Climate Change Policy Program, one of the goals specifically set out is to enhance the ability to bear the impacts of climate change, as well as to raise the public awareness on climate change. China's National Climate Change Policy states that it will integrate climate change policies into the national development strategy. In China, this national policy comes in the form of its "Five Year Plans for Economic and Social Development". China's Five Year Plans serve as the strategic road maps for the country's development. The goals spelled out in the Five Year Plans are mandatory as government officials are held responsible for meeting the targets.

The Great Green Wall is a major tree planting initiative aiming to combat climate change.

Policies and legislation
Climate change has not been a priority to China until recently (around 2008), when this issue was brought to a higher platform. Chinese state affairs operate as a central system, not a federal system. For example, the central government makes decisions and the local governments fulfill them. As a result, the local governments receive constraints and are measured by their performance from the central governments. Solving environmental issues such as climate change requires long-term investments in money, resources, and time. It is believed that these efforts will be detrimental to economic growth, which is of particular importance to the promotion of local government executives. This is why local governments have no engagement in addressing this issue.

In China's first NDC submission, key areas were identified for climate change adaptation, including agriculture, water resources, and vulnerable areas. It also mentioned that an adaptation strategy should be implemented through regional strategies. Flooding in cities is being tackled by collecting and recycling rainwater. In 2013, China issued its National Strategy for Climate Change Adaptation and set goals of reducing vulnerability, strengthening monitoring, and raising public awareness. Efforts on implementation have been put in adapting forestry, meteorological management, infrastructure, and risk planning.

The development of technology and economy in China share more responsibility in tackling climate change. After facing the 2011 smog issue, China's government launched an extensive strategy, which is to improve air quality by reducing the growth of coal consumption. Nevertheless, the trade war that involved China as one of the leading participants has resulted in the loss of control of polluting industries, especially in the steel and cement during 2018. Fortunately, nearly 70 multinational and local brands implemented the monitoring data by The Institute of Public & Environmental Affairs (IPE) in China, stimulating nearly 8,000 suppliers approaching regulatory violations.

Paris agreement 
The Paris agreement is a legally binding international agreement. Its main goal is to limit global warming to below 1.5 degrees Celsius, compared to pre-industrial levels. The Nationally Determined Contributions (NDCs) are the plans to fight climate change adapted for each country, which outlines specific goals and targets for the upcoming five years to help mitigate the effects of climate change. Every party in the agreement has different targets based on its own historical climate records and country's circumstances and all the targets for each country are stated in their NDC.

China is currently a member of the United Nations Framework Convention on Climate Change, the Paris Agreement. As a part of this agreement it has agreed to the 2016 Nationally Determined Contributions (NDC).

The NDC target regarding the China against climate change and greenhouse gas emissions under the Paris agreement are the following:

 Peak of carbon dioxide emissions around 2030.
 60% to 65% reduction of Carbon dioxide emission per unit of its gross domestic product (GDP), compared to 2005.
 Increase the forest stock volume by around 4.5 billion cubic meters on the 2005 level.
In the NDC of China there is a list of things that have been achieved by 2014:

 Proactive approach to climate change (for example enhancing mechanisms to effectively defend key areas).

Progress 
Climate action tracker (CAT) is an independent scientific analysis that tracks government climate action and measures it against the globally agreed Paris Agreement. Climate action tracker found China actions to be "Highly insufficient".

National carbon trading scheme

International cooperation 

Attitudes of the Chinese government on climate change, specifically regarding the role of China in climate change action, have shifted notably in recent years. Historically, climate change was largely seen as a problem that has been created by and should be solved by industrialized countries; in 2015, China said it supports the "common but differentiated responsibilities" principle, which holds that since China is still developing, its abilities and capacities to reduce emissions are comparatively lower than developed countries', but China became the world's largest emitter of carbon dioxide in 2006 and is now responsible for more than a quarter of the world's overall greenhouse gas emissions.

In 2018, the government has urged countries to continue to support the Paris agreement, even in the wake of the United States' withdrawal in 2017. In 2020, Chinese leader Xi Jinping announced at the UN General Assembly in New York that his country will end its contribution to global heating and achieve carbon neutrality by 2060 by adopting "more vigorous policies and measures."

Both internationally and within the People's Republic of China, there has been an ongoing debate over China's economic responsibilities for climate change mitigation. The argument has been made that China has a crucial role to play in keeping global warming under 2 °C, and that this cannot be accomplished unless coal use, which accounts for the majority of China's emissions, falls sharply.  CCP general secretary Xi Jinping says China will "phase down" coal use from 2026 - and will not build new coal-fired projects abroad - but some governments and campaigners say the plans are not going far enough.

The People's Republic of China is an active participant in the climate change talks and other multilateral environmental negotiations, and claims to take environmental challenges seriously but is pushing for the developed world to help developing countries to a greater extent.

However the Belt and Road Initiative is constructing coal-fired power stations (for example Emba Hunutlu power station in Turkey) thus increasing greenhouse gas emissions from other countries.

China is a part of the United Nations Framework Convention on Climate Change, BASIC Alliance.  This alliance is an international commitment to work in partnership with Brazil, South Africa, and India. BASIC's international commitments and goals are to be carbon net-zero before 2060, and to help achieve the global goal from the UNFCCC of reducing emissions to 1.5% degrees Celsius before pre-industrial levels. In 2021, at the UN General Assembly, Chinese leader Xi Jinping stated that China will no longer fund coal-fired power plants abroad. Xi also repeated the country's commitment to achieving carbon neutrality by 2060.

In 2022 the cooperation on climate issues between China and US considerably improved. The countries create "a group from both countries to work toward quickly reducing greenhouse gas emissions." John Kerry mentioned a possibility of technological help from the part of US and informational help from the part of China.

Society and culture

Public opinion 
According to a study from 2017 conducted by the China Climate Change Communication program, 94% of interviewees supported fulfilling the Paris agreement, 96.8% of interviewees supported international cooperation on global climate change, and more than 70% of interviewees were willing to purchase products environmentally friendly . 98.7% of interviewees supported implementing climate change education at schools. Respondents were most concerned about the air pollution caused by climate change. The investigation included 4025 samples.

The investigation showed that Chinese citizens agreed that they were experiencing climate change and that it was caused by human activities.

Furthermore, most Chinese citizens believe individual action on climate change can help, although the government is still seen as the entity most responsible for dealing with climate change. If the government does take action, fiscal and taxation policies are seen as potentially effective.

Activism 

Despite public gatherings and protests being strictly controlled in China, small number of young people have called on the government to increase its action on climate change. In 2019, activist Howey Ou staged the country's first school strike for climate in Guilin. Organisations connected to the government, such as China Youth Climate Action Network, have also disseminated training and public awareness activities related to the issue.

See also

China Carbon Forum
China Beijing Environmental Exchange
Deforestation and climate change
Environment of China
Green growth in China
Plug-in electric vehicles in China
Tianjin Climate Exchange

References

External links
China Climate Change Information Network

 
Environmental issues in China
Climate change by country